Bogie Cottage is a historic cure cottage located at Saranac Lake, town of North Elba in Essex County, New York.  It was built in 1908 and is a large, -story structure on a granite and fieldstone foundation in the American Craftsman style.  It features a hipped roof, shed dormers, two cobblestone chimneys, and a verandah in addition to two levels of cure porches.  The house was a registered sanatorium and operated as a boarding cottage at one time.

It was listed on the National Register of Historic Places in 1992.

References

Houses on the National Register of Historic Places in New York (state)
Houses completed in 1908
Houses in Essex County, New York
National Register of Historic Places in Essex County, New York
Individually listed contributing properties to historic districts on the National Register in New York (state)
1908 establishments in New York (state)
Saranac Lake, New York